Christopher John Reid, FRSL (born 13 May 1949) is a British poet, essayist, cartoonist, and writer. In January 2010 he won the 2009 Costa Book Award for A Scattering, written as a tribute to his late wife, the actress Lucinda Gane. Beside winning the poetry category, Reid became the first poet to take the overall Costa Book of the Year since Seamus Heaney in 1999.
He had been nominated for Whitbread Awards in 1996 and in 1997 (Costa Awards under their previous name).

Biography 

Reid was born in Hong Kong. A contemporary of Martin Amis, he was educated at Tonbridge School and Exeter College, Oxford. He is an exponent of Martian poetry, which employs unusual metaphors to render everyday experiences and objects unfamiliar. He has worked as poetry editor at Faber and Faber and Professor of Creative Writing at the University of Hull.

Books 

Arcadia (1979) – 1980 Somerset Maugham Award, Hawthornden Prize
Pea Soup (1982)
Katerina Brac (1985)
In The Echoey Tunnel (1991)
Universes (1994)
Expanded Universes (1996)
Two Dogs on a Pub Roof (1996)
Mermaids Explained (2001)
For and After (2003)
Mr Mouth (2005)
A Scattering (2009) – Book of the Year, 2009 Costa Book Awards  
The Song of Lunch (2009)
A Box of Tricks for Anna Zyx (2009)
Selected Poems (2011)
Nonsense (2012)
Six Bad Poets (2013)
Anniversary (2015)
The Curiosities (2015)
The Late Sun (2020)

 For children 
 All Sorts: poems, illustrated by Sara Fanelli (London: Ondt & Gracehoper, 1999) 
Alphabicycle Order, ill. Fanelli (Ondt & Gracehoper, 2001)
Old Toffer's Book of Consequential Dogs, illustrated by Elliott Elam — companion book to T.S. Eliot's Old Possum's Practical Cats — (Faber & Faber, 2018)

 As editor 
The Poetry Book Society Anthology 1989-1990 (1989)
Sounds Good: 101 Poems to be Heard (1990)
The May Anthology of Oxford and Cambridge Poetry 1997 (1997)
Not to Speak of the Dog: 101 Short Stories in Verse (2000)
Selected Letters of Ted Hughes (2007)

See also

 Craig Raine
 The Song of Lunch (TV adaptation of his poem)

References

External links
 
 
 Alphabicycle Order horn concerto at WorldCat – monologue with music (chorus with orchestra) by Colin Matthews

1949 births
Living people
Alumni of Exeter College, Oxford
British essayists
British poets
British cartoonists
People educated at Tonbridge School
Fellows of the Royal Society of Literature
Costa Book Award winners
British male essayists
British male poets